Aloysius Iyorgyer Katsina-Alu  (28 August 1941 – 18 July 2018) was a Nigerian jurist and lawyer who served as Chief Justice of Nigeria from 2009 to 2011.

Early life and education 
Katsina-Alu was born on August 28, 1941 in Benue State and he started his early education at St Anne’s Primary School Tarungwa and St.  Patricks Primary School Taraku, before he went to Mount St. Michaels Secondary School Aliede, in Benue State.  He later enrolled at the Nigerian Military Training College, Kaduna, in 1962, from where he moved over to Mons Military Training College, Aldershot, England.  His interest in a military career was short-lived as he returned to the country to pursue a degree in law at the Ahmadu Bello University, Zaria.

In 1964, he proceeded to the Inns of Court School of Law, Gibson and Weldon College of Law, School of Oriental and African Studies, University of London, in furtherance of his legal studies.

Career 
He was called to the English Bar in October 1967 and the Nigerian Bar on June 28, 1968. He began his legal career in July 1968 as a private lawyer in Lagos. He then he became a Legal Officer at the Nigeria Ports Authority NPA, Lagos between 1969 and 1977. After leaving NPA, Katsina-Alu became the Attorney-General and Commissioner for Justice of Benue State in 1978, a position he held until 1979 when he was appointed a judge of the Benue State High Court. From the High Court in Benue, he was elevated to the Court of Appeal in 1985, where he served until November 1998, when he was appointed a Justice of the Supreme Court. He was sworn in as Justices of the Supreme Court of Nigeria on 25 November 1998 and after spending 11 years on the Bench he became the 11th Chief Justice of Nigeria on December 30, 2009. He retired from this exalted position on August 26, 2011 having clocked the mandatory age of retirement 70 years.

He was sworn in as the Chief Justice of the Supreme Court of Nigeria on Wednesday 30 December 2009 by his predecessor as Chief Justice of the Supreme Court, Idris Legbo Kutigi. There was some controversy over the ceremony, since in all previous ceremonies the Oath of Office was administered by the President of Nigeria. However, President Umaru Yar'Adua was unavailable on account of ill health since November 2009, and had failed to hand over to his vice president.

Death 
He died on 18 July 2018 at an orthopedic Hospital in Abuja.He died at the age of 76 years old.

References

Supreme Court of Nigeria justices
1941 births
2018 deaths
People from Benue State
Chief justices of Nigeria